The 2009 Galician regional election was held on Sunday, 1 March 2009, to elect the 8th Parliament of the autonomous community of Galicia. All 75 seats in the Parliament were up for election. The election was held simultaneously with a regional election in the Basque Country.

The election saw the People's Party (PP) retake control of the parliament from the coalition of the Socialists' Party of Galicia (PSdeG–PSOE) and the Galician Nationalist Bloc (BNG), with a majority of 1 seat. As a result, Alberto Núñez Feijoo became the new President of Galicia.

Overview

Electoral system
The Parliament of Galicia was the devolved, unicameral legislature of the autonomous community of Galicia, having legislative power in regional matters as defined by the Spanish Constitution of 1978 and the regional Statute of Autonomy, as well as the ability to vote confidence in or withdraw it from a regional president.

Voting for the Parliament was on the basis of universal suffrage, which comprised all nationals over 18 years of age, registered in Galicia and in full enjoyment of their political rights. The 75 members of the Parliament of Galicia were elected using the D'Hondt method and a closed list proportional representation, with an electoral threshold of five percent of valid votes—which included blank ballots—being applied in each constituency. Parties not reaching the threshold were not taken into consideration for seat distribution. Seats were allocated to constituencies, corresponding to the provinces of A Coruña, Lugo, Ourense and Pontevedra, with each being allocated an initial minimum of 10 seats and the remaining 35 being distributed in proportion to their populations.

The use of the D'Hondt method might result in a higher effective threshold, depending on the district magnitude.

Election date
The term of the Parliament of Galicia expired four years after the date of its previous election, unless it was dissolved earlier. The election decree was required to be issued no later than the twenty-fifth day prior to the date of expiry of parliament and published on the following day in the Official Journal of Galicia (DOG), with election day taking place between the fifty-fourth and the sixtieth day from publication. The previous election was held on 19 June 2005, which meant that the legislature's term would have expired on 19 June 2009. The election decree was required to be published in the DOG no later than 26 May 2009, with the election taking place up to the sixtieth day from publication, setting the latest possible election date for the Parliament on Saturday, 25 July 2009.

The president had the prerogative to dissolve the Parliament of Galicia and call a snap election, provided that it did not occur before one year had elapsed since a previous dissolution under this procedure. In the event of an investiture process failing to elect a regional president within a two-month period from the first ballot, the Parliament was to be automatically dissolved and a fresh election called.

Parties and candidates
The electoral law allowed for parties and federations registered in the interior ministry, coalitions and groupings of electors to present lists of candidates. Parties and federations intending to form a coalition ahead of an election were required to inform the relevant Electoral Commission within ten days of the election call, whereas groupings of electors needed to secure the signature of at least one percent of the electorate in the constituencies for which they sought election, disallowing electors from signing for more than one list of candidates.

Below is a list of the main parties and electoral alliances which contested the election:

Opinion polls
The tables below list opinion polling results in reverse chronological order, showing the most recent first and using the dates when the survey fieldwork was done, as opposed to the date of publication. Where the fieldwork dates are unknown, the date of publication is given instead. The highest percentage figure in each polling survey is displayed with its background shaded in the leading party's colour. If a tie ensues, this is applied to the figures with the highest percentages. The "Lead" column on the right shows the percentage-point difference between the parties with the highest percentages in a poll.

Voting intention estimates
The table below lists weighted voting intention estimates. Refusals are generally excluded from the party vote percentages, while question wording and the treatment of "don't know" responses and those not intending to vote may vary between polling organisations. When available, seat projections determined by the polling organisations are displayed below (or in place of) the percentages in a smaller font; 38 seats were required for an absolute majority in the Parliament of Galicia.

Voting preferences
The table below lists raw, unweighted voting preferences.

Victory preferences
The table below lists opinion polling on the victory preferences for each party in the event of a general election taking place.

Victory likelihood
The table below lists opinion polling on the perceived likelihood of victory for each party in the event of a regional election taking place.

Preferred President
The table below lists opinion polling on leader preferences to become president of the Regional Government of Galicia.

Results

Overall

Distribution by constituency

Aftermath

References
Opinion poll sources

Other

2009 in Galicia (Spain)
Galicia
Regional elections in Galicia (Spain)
March 2009 events in Europe